Samarium(III) chloride, also known as samarium trichloride, is an inorganic compound of samarium and chloride.  It is a pale yellow salt that rapidly absorbs water to form a hexahydrate, SmCl3.6H2O. The compound has few practical applications but is used in laboratories for research on new compounds of samarium.

Structure
Like several related chlorides of the lanthanides and actinides, SmCl3 crystallises in the UCl3 motif. The Sm3+ centres are nine-coordinate, occupying trigonal prismatic sites with additional chloride ligands occupying the three square faces.

Preparation and reactions
SmCl3 is prepared by the "ammonium chloride" route, which involves the initial synthesis of (NH4)2[SmCl5].  This material can be prepared from the common starting materials at reaction temperatures of 230 °C from samarium oxide:
10 NH4Cl  +  Sm2O3  →  2 (NH4)2[SmCl5]  +  6 NH3 + 3 H2O

The pentachloride is then heated to 350-400 °C resulting in evolution of ammonium chloride and leaving a residue of the anhydrous trichloride:
 (NH4)2[SmCl5]  →  2 NH4Cl  +  SmCl3

It can also be prepared from samarium metal and hydrochloric acid.
2 Sm + 6 HCl  → 2 SmCl3 + 3 H2

Aqueous solutions of samarium(III) chloride can be prepared by dissolving metallic samarium or samarium carbonate in hydrochloric acid.

Samarium(III) chloride is a moderately strong Lewis acid, which ranks as "hard" according to the HSAB concept.  Aqueous solutions of samarium chloride can be used to prepare samarium trifluoride:
SmCl3  + 3 KF   →   SmF3 + 3 KCl

Uses 
Samarium(III) chloride is used for the preparation of samarium metal, which has a variety of uses, notably in magnets.  Anhydrous SmCl3 is mixed with sodium chloride or calcium chloride to give a low melting point eutectic mixture. Electrolysis of this molten salt solution gives the free metal.

In laboratory
Samarium(III) chloride can also be used as a starting point for the preparation of other samarium salts. The anhydrous chloride is used to prepare organometallic compounds of samarium, such as bis(pentamethylcyclopentadienyl)alkylsamarium(III) complexes.

References 

Chlorides
Samarium compounds
Lanthanide halides